This is a list of notable events in country music that took place in the year 1920.

Events

Top hits of the year

Births 
 February 13 – Boudleaux Bryant, songwriter (with wife Felice) of many 1950s and 1960s hits (died 1987).
 March 10 – Kenneth C. "Jethro" Burns, of the Homer and Jethro comedy duo (died 1989).
 July 27 – Henry D. "Homer" Haynes, of the Homer and Jethro comedy duo (died 1971).
 December 19 – Little Jimmy Dickens, novelty singer and longtime member of the Grand Ole Opry (died 2015).

Deaths

See also
 1920 in music 
 List of years in country music

Further reading 
 Kingsbury, Paul, "Vinyl Hayride: Country Music Album Covers 1947–1989," Country Music Foundation, 2003
 Millard, Bob, "Country Music: 70 Years of America's Favorite Music," HarperCollins, New York, 1993
 Whitburn, Joel. "Top Country Songs 1944–2005 – 6th Edition." 2005.

Country
Country music by year